The Kaunas massacre of October 29, 1941, also known as the Great Action, was the largest mass murder of Lithuanian Jews.

By the order of SS-Standartenführer Karl Jäger and SS-Rottenführer Helmut Rauca, the Sonderkommando under the leadership of SS-Obersturmführer Joachim Hamann, and 8 to 10 men from Einsatzkommando 3, murdered 2,007 Jewish men, 2,920 women, and 4,273 children in a single day at the Ninth Fort in Kaunas, Generalbezirk Litauen, as German occupied Lithuania was then known.

The Nazis destroyed the small ghetto on October 4, 1941, and killed almost all of its inhabitants at the Ninth Fort. Later that same month, on October 28, SS-Rottenführer Helmut Rauca of the Kaunas Gestapo (secret state police) conducted the selection in the Kaunas Ghetto. All ghetto inhabitants were forced to assemble in the central square of the ghetto. Rauca selected 9,200 Jewish men, women, and children, about one-third of the ghetto's population. The next day, October 29, all of these people were shot at the Ninth Fort in huge pits dug in advance.

See also 
Holocaust in Lithuania
Kaunas pogrom
Ponary massacre

References 

Jews and Judaism in Kaunas
Massacres in 1941
Lithuanian collaboration with Nazi Germany
History of Kaunas
Military history of Lithuania during World War II
Einsatzgruppen
Holocaust massacres and pogroms in Lithuania
1941 in Lithuania
World War II massacres
October 1941 events
20th century in Kaunas